GS Iraklis Women's Basketball is the women's basketball department of G.S. Iraklis, the Greek multi-sports club based in Thessaloniki. The club plays in A2 Ethniki (2nd tier). They have won three Greek Championships, in 1968, 1970 and 1971.

History
Iraklis Women's Basketball was the first champion of the Greek Women's Basketball League, in 1968. Iraklis won even two championships, in 1971 and 1972. Nevertheless, the next years the club was weakened. The last presence in A1 Ethniki was the season 2007-08, when it finished one place above the last place and was relegated. In current season Iraklis plays in A2 Ethniki.

Recent seasons

Honours
Greek Women's Basketball League
Winners (3): 1968, 1970, 1971

References

External links
Iraklis Thessaloniki

Iraklis Thessaloniki
Women's basketball teams in Greece
Basketball teams in Thessaloniki